KANSL3, or KAT8 regulatory NSL complex subunit 3 is a protein that in humans is encoded by the KANSL3 gene.

References

Further reading